Helge Igor Lindberg (1887–1928) was a Finnish opera singer who was a popular concert singer in the 1920s throughout Europe. He was also a sculptor. Helge Lindberg first studied violin at the conservatory in Helsinki. In 1907, he studied voice in Munich and finished his studies in Florence. He was known for singing works by Johann Sebastian Bach, George Frideric Handel and Yrjö Kilpinen.

From Musica Fennica (1965) (Timo Makinin and Seppo Nummi, authors):

He received a medal from the King of Sweden for his singing. His known sculptures include a 12-inch wooden statue of himself as a satyr (1927); a sitting Buddha; a crucified Christ; and a black stone bust of his second wife (lost in Buenos Aires after her death).

He died of pneumonia in 1928 and his ashes are interred on a small island off the southern coast of Finland (San Scher), which he had bought as a summer retreat. He was survived by his first wife Ernestine (Erna); his second wife Friederike (Fritzi), a member of the novelty group the Seven Viennese Singing Sisters (see Wikipedia link); and his sons Kim, Lars, and Dian.

A biography was written on his life by Kosti Vehanen:
Vehanen, Kosti: Mestarilaulaja Helge Lindberg. Kustannusyhtiö Kirja, Helsinki 1929.

Known recordings include:
"Frohsinn und Schwermut" (Händel), "Wie glänzt der helle Mond" (Wolf) and "Der Wanderer" (Schubert) and "Froh lacht die Brust" (see link to song below). Six recordings have been digitized and placed online by the Music Library of the National Library of Finland and can be found in Raita, a collection of digitized early Finnish sound recordings, by searching this site with "Helge Lindberg".

References

External links 

A painting was made of him by the Bauhaus artist Johannes Itten in 1916:
 http://laurentberges.tumblr.com/post/6970643135/johannes-itten-helge-lindberg-1915

A Waldemar Eide photo can be found here:
 http://www.fotohistorie.no/media.php?id=7956

 picture in 1917.
 later picture
MP3 link of "Der Wanderer" (other recordings sung by Lindberg are also on this site)
 https://www.doria.fi/handle/10024/66486
Exhibition by the Finnland-Institute in Germany
 https://web.archive.org/web/20151002171627/http://finnland-institut.de/musikbeziehungen/helge_lindberg.html

Deaths from pneumonia in Austria
1887 births
1927 deaths
Finnish emigrants to Austria
20th-century Finnish male opera singers